The Dehcho First Nations is a tribal council representing the Dene (South Slavey) and Métis people of the Dehcho Region of the Northwest Territories, Canada. It is made up of ten First Nations bands and two Métis Locals.

Membership

The Deh Cho First Nations Tribal Council is made up of several First Nations and Métis locals including:

Notable members 
 Dahti Tsetso, environmentalist and educator

See also
List of tribal councils in British Columbia

References

External links
 Dehcho First Nations

Politics of the Northwest Territories
First Nations in the Northwest Territories
Dehcho Region
Sahtu Region
South Slave Region
Dene governments
First Nations tribal councils